Ilias Iliadis (born Jarji Zviadauri, on 10 November 1986) is a Georgian-born Greek judoka. He was named the 2014 Greek Male Athlete of the Year.

He won a gold medal in the half-middleweight (81 kg) division at the 2004 Summer Olympics in Athens at age 17. Illiadis also won a gold medal 6 years later at the 2010 World Judo Championships in Tokyo in the −90 kg category.

As Greece's flagbearer, he had the honour of being the first athlete to march into the Bird's Nest Stadium during the opening ceremony of the 2008 Summer Olympics in Beijing.

Iliadis is a cousin of another Olympic champion, Georgian judoka Zurab Zviadauri, who also won gold at the 2004 Summer Olympic games. Iliadis's family moved to Greece in 2003. He was adopted by Nikos Iliadis.

Since November 2019 Iliadis works as head coach for the Uzbek national team.

Achievements

References

External links

 
 
 
 
 

1986 births
Living people
Greek male judoka
Male judoka from Georgia (country)
Judoka at the 2004 Summer Olympics
Judoka at the 2008 Summer Olympics
Judoka at the 2012 Summer Olympics
Judoka at the 2016 Summer Olympics
Olympic judoka of Greece
Olympic gold medalists for Greece
Olympic bronze medalists for Greece
Naturalized citizens of Greece
Georgian emigrants to Greece
Olympic medalists in judo
World judo champions
Medalists at the 2012 Summer Olympics
Medalists at the 2004 Summer Olympics
European champions for Greece
Judoka at the 2015 European Games
European Games medalists in judo
European Games bronze medalists for Greece
Mediterranean Games gold medalists for Greece
Competitors at the 2005 Mediterranean Games
Competitors at the 2009 Mediterranean Games
Greek people of Georgian descent
Mediterranean Games medalists in judo
People from Kakheti